K. T. Jacob (19211976) was an Indian politician who was the Minister for Revenue in Kerala from 1 November 1969 to 3 August 1970 in the First C. Achutha Menon ministry.

References

1921 births
1976 deaths
Communist Party of India politicians from Kerala